Social simulation games are a subgenre of life simulation game that explore social interactions between multiple artificial lives. Some examples include The Sims and Animal Crossing series.

History

Influences and origins
When The Sims was released in 2000, it was referred to as "almost the only game of its kind". But there are several important precursors to The Sims and the social simulation genre. Firstly, the game's creator Will Wright acknowledged the influence of Little Computer People, a Commodore 64 game from 1985. The games are similar, although The Sims is described as having a richer gameplay experience. Secondly, Will Wright also acknowledged the influence of dollhouses on The Sims, which have generally also informed the gameplay of this genre.

Animal Crossing was released in 2001 for the Nintendo 64 in Japan. While released towards the end of the life cycle of the Nintendo 64, it developed a following that led to it being ported to the Nintendo GameCube and released throughout the world. As the game's popularity has surged, this series has also been described as a social simulation game. Story of Seasons, a series that began in 1996 and is often compared to Animal Crossing, has also been described as a social simulation game. Its social simulation elements are derived from dating sims, a subgenre that dates back to the early 1980s, with games such as Tenshitachi no gogo in 1985 and Girl's Garden in 1984.

Since the initial success of these games in the early 2000s, video game journalists have begun to refer to a group of similar games as belonging to the social simulation game genre.

Recent history
Several other social simulation games have emerged to capitalize on the success of The Sims. This includes several sequels and expansion packs, as well as games like Singles: Flirt Up Your Life with heavy similarities.

Examples
Little Computer People (1985)—by David Crane, published by Activision
Tenshitachi no Gogo (1985)—One of the earliest dating sims, released for the 16-bit NEC PC-9801 computer.
Alter Ego (1986)—a personality computer game by Activision
The Money Game series (1988–1989)
The Money Game (1988)—a Famicom life simulation about balance love with high finance
Wall Street Kid (1989)—the Famicom sequel to The Money Game (The Money Game II: Kabutochou no Kiseki)
Jones in the Fast Lane (1990)—by Sierra Entertainment is one of the earliest life simulators.
My Life My Love: Boku no Yume: Watashi no Negai (1991)—a life simulation for the Japanese Famicom system
Princess Maker series (1991–2007)—by Gainax
Princess Maker (1991)—by Gainax, a raising sim which the player must raise an adoptive daughter until she reaches adulthood. The final result varies from a ruling queen, to an ordinary housewife, to even a prostitute if the player looks after her poorly.
Princess Maker 2 (1993)
Princess Maker: Legend of Another World (1995)
Princess Maker 3: Fairy Tales Come True (1997)
Princess Maker 4 (2006)—by GeneX
Princess Maker 5 (2007)
 Tokimeki Memorial series (1994–2014)—6 main games and a large number of spin-offs
True Love (1995)—a Japanese erotic dating sim and general life simulation game where the player must manage the player's daily activities, such as studying, exercise, and employment.
Persona series (1996–2020)—6 main games and several spin-offs, although the first 3 games do not emphasize this aspect very much.
Story of Seasons series (1996–2016)—by Marvelous Entertainment, farming simulator, role-playing game, and dating sim rolled into one.
 Shenmue series (1999–2019)
The Sims series (2000–2014)
The Sims (2000)—by Will Wright, published by EA for the PC.
The Sims 2 (2004).
The Sims 3 (2009).
The Sims 4 (2014).
Animal Crossing series (2001–2020)—a life simulator by Nintendo. It has also been dubbed as a "communication game" by the company as had Cubivore, Doshin the Giant and GiFTPiA.
Real Lives (2001)—an educational life simulator by Educational Simulations where the player is randomly "born" somewhere in the world and often must deal with third-world difficulties such as disease, malnutrition, and civil war.
Singles series (2003–2005)
Singles: Flirt Up Your Life (2003)
Singles 2: Triple Trouble (2005)
Democracy (2005)—a government simulation game that was first developed by Positech Games, with a sequel released in December 2007 and a third game in 2013.
Eccky (2005)—by Media Republic.
Façade (2005)—An artificial-intelligence-based interactive story created by Michael Mateas and Andrew Stern.
Nights series (2005–2008) 
New York Nights: Success in the City (2005)—a social simulation created and designed by Gameloft released for mobile phones.
Miami Nights: Singles in the City (2006)
Tokyo City Nights (2008)
The Idolmaster series (2005–)—an idol raising sim by Namco.
Kudos (2006)—by Positech Games. There is a 2008 sequel Kudos 2.
Virtual Villagers series (2006–2010)—by Last Day of Work.
Tomodachi series (2009–2013)—by Nintendo
Tomodachi Collection (2009)
Tomodachi Life (2013)
Castaway Paradise (2014)
Stardew Valley (2016)

See also
 Dating sim
 List of simulation video games
 Simulated reality
 Social simulation

References

 
Video game genres